Section 51 of the Constitution of Australia enumerates the legislative powers granted to the Parliament of Australia by the Australian States at Federation. Each subsection, or 'head of power', provides a topic under which the parliament is empowered to make laws. There are other sections in the constitution that enable the parliament to enact laws, although the scope of those other sections are generally limited in comparison with section 51.

The powers
The powers enumerated within section 51 are reflective in their topics of being those that Australia's colonies perceived as being best within the purview of a national government. The full list of powers is available on the Australian Parliament's website. 

In modern times, the most prominent heads of power for Commonwealth legislative purposes are arguably: (i) the interstate trade and commerce power, (ii) the taxation power, (xx) the corporations power, and (xxix) the external affairs power. This is because these sections have been interpreted by the High Court as wide in scope, and so are extensively relied upon by the Commonwealth when attempting legislative enactment. The wide scope of these sections have at times been legally controversial in Australia; most notably in the Workchoices and Tasmanian dams cases, which expanded the understood applicable scope of the corporations power, and external affairs power, respectively. 

Other particularly notable powers in history have been the (vi) defence power, (see: Australian Communist Party v Commonwealth), the (xix) naturalisation and aliens power, the (xxxi) 'just terms' property acquisition power, the (xxvi) power to make special laws in relation to peoples of a particular race, and the s51(xxiii) & (xxiiiA) power to provide social services (notable in part for having been implemented in 1946 via referendum) 

With some exceptions, the remainder of the powers in s51 pertain to the standardization of commerce across Australia, empowering the federal government to enact laws in relation to metrics, statistics, finance, interstate commercial disputes, and other related issues. 

Additionally, two subsections provide for the referral of matters to the Australian Parliament by Australia's State Governments. Specifically, (xxxvii) allows State Parliaments to refer matters within their competence to the commonwealth, and (xxxviii) allows state parliaments to refer any matter that the UK Parliament or Federal Council of Australasia could legislate on their behalf at the establishment of the Commonwealth. 

The incidental power (xxxix) allows the Commonwealth to act on matters 'incidental' any power of the constitution. Most notably this includes the section 61 of the constitution, which vests the Australian Government with Executive Power. As a result, it is one of the most important sections in practice.

Interpretive history

The High Court's approach to section 51 has changed over time. Initially, the court adopted the 'Reserved Powers' doctrine, an interpretive view that the Australian States had implicitly retained competence in core areas, which were unable to be displaced by the Commonwealth even through reliance upon the powers enumerated in s51.

This doctrine was famously, and emphatically, rejected by the Isaac's court in the Engineers' Case. Following this case, the reserved powers doctrine was abandoned; although it has notably reappeared a number of times in argument by State governments when arguing against Commonwealth legislation.

Since federation the enumerated powers in section 51 have tended overall to have expanded in scope. In particular, the Corporations and external affairs powers are notable for having a significantly larger breadth in modern times than at federation.

When interpreting whether a particular act of parliament is within the scope, or is incidental to an enumerated power; the dominant test legal test applied by the court has been whether the law in question is a reasonable and appropriate means of furthering an object or purpose in the power.

Tied grants

In practice, section 51 is not a strong limit on federal involvement in Australia's political life. Section 96 of the Australian Constitution grants the power to grant money to any State, "on such terms and conditions as the Parliament thinks fit."  In effect, the Commonwealth can make grants subject to States implementing particular policies in their fields of legislative responsibility.  Such grants, known as tied grants (since they are tied to a particular purpose), have been used to give the federal parliament influence over state policy matters such as public hospitals and schools.

Section 96 does not compel a state to accept a grant, so constitutionally a state may refuse a grant and not implement any policy conditions.  However, since a uniform federal system of income tax was introduced in 1942 (under s51(ii)) a vertical fiscal imbalance has arisen and the Commonwealth Parliament has had a vastly larger budget. It also has control over state borrowings (under subsection iv). This has meant that the Parliament's powers have effectively been extended beyond the constraints of section 51 and other explicit grants of legislative power (e.g. section 52 and section 90).

See also
Section 51(xxxviii) of the Constitution of Australia

References

Summers, Woodward & Parkin [eds], Government, Politics, Power and Policy in Australia, 7th edition, 2002.

External links

  (2000) 24 Melbourne University Law Review 839.

Australian constitutional law
Federalism in Australia